Antipodectes is a genus of katydids belonging to the family Tettigoniidae.

The species of this genus are found in Australia.

Species:

Antipodectes bituberculatus 
Antipodectes brevicaudus 
Antipodectes giganteus 
Antipodectes graminicolus 
Antipodectes memorialis 
Antipodectes monteithi 
Antipodectes uncinatus

References

Tettigoniidae